Ayenia is a genus of flowering plants in the mallow family, Malvaceae. It contains erect, taprooted shrubs with serrated leaves. They are native to warm areas in the Americas.

Selected species

References

External links

Jepson Manual Treatment
USDA Plants Profile

Byttnerioideae
Malvaceae genera